1625 The NORC, provisional designation , is a carbonaceous asteroid from the outer region of the asteroid belt, approximately 55 kilometers in diameter. It was discovered on 1 September 1953, by Belgian astronomer Sylvain Arend at the Royal Observatory of Belgium in Uccle, Belgium. It was named after the IBM Naval Ordnance Research Calculator (NORC).

Orbit and classification 

The NORC orbits the Sun in the outer main-belt at a distance of 2.5–3.9 AU once every 5 years and 8 months (2,083 days). Its orbit has an eccentricity of 0.23 and an inclination of 16° with respect to the ecliptic.

Physical characteristics 

In the Tholen classification, The NORC is a common carbonaceous C-type asteroid.

Lightcurves 

Between 2009 and 2014, five rotational light-curve were obtained of The NORC from photometric observations taken by René Roy, David Higgins and the Palomar Transient Factory. The light-curves gave a rotation period between 12.94 and 18.820 hours with a change in brightness of 0.06 to 0.33 in magnitude. The best rated result with a period of 13.959 hours (Δmag 0.16) was obtained by Australian amateur astronomer David Higgins.

Diameter and albedo 

According to the surveys carried out by Japanese Akari satellite and NASA's Wide-field Infrared Survey Explorer with its subsequent NEOWISE mission, The NORC measures between 44.66 and 75.11 kilometers in diameter, and its surface has an albedo of 0.023 and 0.065. The Collaborative Asteroid Lightcurve Link assumes a standard albedo for carbonaceous asteroids of 0.057 and calculates a diameter of 47.60 kilometers using an absolute magnitude of 10.34.

Naming 

This minor planet was named after the IBM Naval Ordnance Research Calculator (NORC), IBM's first-generation vacuum tube computer built in the 1950s (also see List of vacuum tube computers and ). NORC was the fastest, most powerful electronic computer of its time. Under the direction of Wallace J. Eckert, after whom the asteroid 1750 Eckert is named, NORC performed a vast amount of orbital calculations for minor planet. The official  was published by the Minor Planet Center in May 1957.

References

External links 
 About NORC:   
 Intermediate Palomar Transient Factory – home
 Asteroid Lightcurve Database (LCDB), query form (info )
 Dictionary of Minor Planet Names, Google books
 Asteroids and comets rotation curves, CdR – Observatoire de Genève, Raoul Behrend
 Discovery Circumstances: Numbered Minor Planets (1)-(5000) – Minor Planet Center
 
 

001625
Discoveries by Sylvain Arend
Named minor planets
001625
19530901